Grete Griffin (née Šadeiko) (born 29 May 1993) is an Estonian heptathlete. At the 2010 World Junior Championships in Moncton, Canada she placed fourth with her personal record 5705 points, just one point behind Helga Margrét Thorsteinsdóttir. In the fall of 2012, she joined Florida State University.

Achievements

Personal bests

Personal life
In August 2016, Šadeiko became romantically linked to NFL quarterback Robert Griffin III. Sadeiko and Griffin became engaged on 13 May 2017. Their first daughter was born on 2 July 2017. The couple married on 10 March 2018, and their second daughter was born in September 2019.

Šadeiko's older sister Grit Šadeiko is also a heptathlete.

References

External links
 

1993 births
Living people
People from Türi
Estonian heptathletes
Estonian sportswomen